Kurtziella accinctus is a species of sea snail, a marine gastropod mollusk in the family Mangeliidae.

Description
The length of the shell attains 10 mm.

The shell is slightly shouldered. It is longitudinally obliquely ribbed, very closely spirally striated. Its color is white, with sometimes an orange-brown band below the periphery.

Distribution
This species occurs in the Caribbean Sea off Colombia. This species was described by Montagu by error as British.

References

External links
  Tucker, J.K. 2004 Catalog of recent and fossil turrids (Mollusca: Gastropoda). Zootaxa 682:1–1295.

accinctus
Gastropods described in 1808